HMS Stirling Castle was a 64-gun third rate ship of the line of the Royal Navy, built by Israel Pownoll and launched on 28 June 1775 at Chatham.

She was wrecked on 5 October 1780 on the Silver Keys, off Cap François, off the coast of Cuba with the loss of most of her crew. As the Massachusetts ship Aurora was sailing from Boston to Port-au-Prince she came upon the wreckage of Stirling Castle and was able to save a midshipman and four seamen.

Citations and references
Citations

References

Hepper, David J. (1994) British Warship Losses in the Age of Sail, 1650–1859. (Rotherfield: Jean Boudriot).  
 Lavery, Brian (2003) The Ship of the Line – Volume 1: The development of the battlefleet 1650–1850. Conway Maritime Press. .

Ships of the line of the Royal Navy
Worcester-class ships of the line
1775 ships
Shipwrecks in the Caribbean Sea
Maritime incidents in 1780